Waverly Community Schools is a school district managing six schools in Lansing, Michigan, United States. The superintendent is Kelly Blake.

Schools
Waverly Senior High School, grades 9-12
Waverly Middle School, grades 7-8
East Intermediate School, grades 5-6
Elmwood Elementary School, grades 1-4
Winans Elementary School, grades 1-4
Colt Early Childhood Education Center, grades preschool-Kindergarten

In the fall of 2011, the district closed Windermere View Elementary School.

Notable alumni
 Muhsin Muhammad
 John Smoltz
 Marcus Taylor

References

External links
Waverly Community Schools webpage
Waverly Community Schools Technology Plan

School districts in Michigan
Education in Ingham County, Michigan